The Kamloops Blazers are a junior ice hockey team in the Western Hockey League (WHL). The team plays in the B.C. Division of the Western Conference, is based out of Kamloops, British Columbia, and play home games at Sandman Centre.

The Blazers originated as the Estevan Bruins in 1966, became the New Westminster Bruins in 1971, and relocated to Kamloops in 1981 as the Kamloops Junior Oilers. The Blazers have won the Memorial Cup three times; in 1992, 1994, and 1995, and the Ed Chynoweth Cup six times.

History
The franchise was granted in 1966 as the Estevan Bruins in Estevan, Saskatchewan. In 1971, it moved to New Westminster, British Columbia, and was known as the New Westminster Bruins. It then moved to Kamloops in 1981 and was known as the Junior Oilers until 1984, when it was given its present name, the Kamloops Blazers. The team moved from the Kamloops Memorial Arena to the Riverside Coliseum, then renamed the "Interior Savings Centre", in 1992, and finally changed to the Sandman Centre in 2015, due to co-owner Tom Gaglardi also owning the Sandman hotels brand.

The team has won the most Memorial Cups of any team in the WHL with five, two as New Westminster (1977 and 1978) and three as Kamloops (1992, 1994 and 1995). The Canadian Hockey League (CHL) record is seven, held by the Ontario Hockey League's Toronto Marlboros, now known as the Guelph Storm. 

The franchise began in 1946 as the Humboldt Indians of the Saskatchewan Junior Hockey League (SJHL) and moved to Estevan to become the Bruins in 1957. The franchise has won the President's Cup a record 11 times, once in Estevan, four times in a row in New Westminster and six times since relocating to Kamloops. The Blazers hosted the 1995 Memorial Cup, also winning the WHL championship that year.

The team was featured as a plot element in a book called Blazer Drive by Sigmund Brouwer.

WHL finals appearances
1983–84: Win, 4–3 vs. Regina
1984–85: Loss, 0–4 vs. Prince Albert
1985–86: Win, 4–1 vs. Medicine Hat
1987–88: Loss, 2–4 vs. Medicine Hat
1989–90: Win, 4–1 vs. Lethbridge
1991–92: Win, 4–3 vs. Saskatoon
1993–94: Win, 4–3 vs. Saskatoon
1994–95: Win, 4–2 vs. Brandon
1998–99: Loss, 1–4 vs. Calgary

Memorial Cup appearances
1984 Memorial Cup – Loss, 2–7 vs. Ottawa in semifinal (as Kamloops Junior Oilers)
1986 Memorial Cup – Loss, 3–9 vs. Hull in semifinal
1990 Memorial Cup – Loss, 0–3 in round-robin (vs. Kitchener (7–8 OT), Oshawa (6–7 OT) & Laval (2–4))
1992 Memorial Cup – Win, 5–4 vs. Sault Ste. Marie
1994 Memorial Cup – Win, 5–3 vs. Laval
1995 Memorial Cup – Win, 8–2 vs. Detroit

Coaches

Notable head coaches in the history of the Kamloops Blazers include Ken Hitchcock, Tom Renney, Don Hay, Marc Habscheid and Dean Evason.

Players

Current roster
Updated February 20, 2023.

 

 

 
 

 
 

 
 
 
 

 

 

 

 
 
 

|}

NHL alumni
Totals include those who played for the franchise as the Kamloops Junior Oilers

Jared Aulin
Warren Babe
Rudolfs Balcers
Len Barrie
Victor Bartley
Nolan Baumgartner
Robin Bawa
Brian Benning
Craig Berube
Doug Bodger
Zac Boyer
Mike Brown
Rob Brown
Garth Butcher
Kyle Calder
Jim Camazzola
Erik Christensen
Dave Chyzowski
Dean Clark
Ken Daneyko
Scott Daniels
Jarrett Deuling
Rob DiMaio
Shane Doan
Hnat Domenichelli
Devan Dubnyk
Micki DuPont
Joel Edmundson
Keaton Ellerby
Todd Ewen
Dean Evason
Dylan Ferguson
Scott Ferguson
Mark Ferner
Steve Gainey
Marc Habscheid
Richard Hajdu
Bruce Holloway
Greg Hawgood
Corey Hirsch
Jason Holland
Tony Horacek
Ryan Huska
Jarome Iginla
Connor Ingram
Jonas Johansson
Ty Jones
Mark Kachowski
Matt Kassian
Doug Kostynski
Paul Kruse
Bryce Lampman
JC Lipon
Jan Ludvig
Brad Lukowich
Ray Macias
David Mackey
Pat MacLeod
Mike MacWilliam
Dean Malkoc
Dave Marcinyshyn
Gord Mark
Shaone Morrisonn
Glenn Mulvenna
Chris Murray
Tyson Nash
Mike Needham
Scott Niedermayer
Colton Orr
Steve Passmore
Ed Patterson
Garrett Pilon
Rudy Poeschek
Gage Quinney
Brendan Ranford
Daryl Reaugh
Mark Recchi
Robyn Regehr
Cam Severson
Ron Shudra
Trevor Sim
Rob Skrlac
Tyler Sloan
Colin Smith
Geoff Smith
Ryan Stewart
Jason Strudwick
Darryl Sydor
Darcy Tucker
Scottie Upshall
Kris Versteeg
Gordie Walker
David Wilkie

Season-by-season record
Note: GP = Games played, W = Wins, L = Losses, T = Ties, OTL = Overtime losses, SOL = Shootout losses, Pts = Points, GF = Goals for, GA = Goals against

See also
List of ice hockey teams in British Columbia

References

External links
 Kamloops Blazers official website

Ice hockey teams in British Columbia
Ice hockey clubs established in 1981
Western Hockey League teams
Sport in Kamloops
1981 establishments in British Columbia
Northland Properties